Matias Garafulic Schar (born 1 September 2000) is a Chilean international rugby union player, who plays for Selknam.

He was part of the Chilean team that qualified for their first Rugby World Cup in 2022, upsetting the odds against Canada and the United States, as Garafulic scored a try in the last game of the Americas qualification against the latter, an historic away win that sealed their qualification for the 2023 World Cup.

References

External links

2000 births
Sportspeople from São Paulo
Living people
Chilean rugby union players
Chile international rugby union players
Rugby union centres
Rugby union wings
Selknam (rugby union) players